Savathiya Neralu (Kannada: ಸವತಿಯ ನೆರಳು) is a 1979 Indian Kannada film, directed by Y. R. Swamy and produced by S. Suresh. The film stars Srinath, Manjula, Ambareesh and Leelavathi in the lead roles. It is adapted from Aryamba Pattabhi's novel of the same name which was based on Daphne du Maurier's cult classic Rebecca. The film has musical score by Chellapilla Satyam.

Cast
Srinath
Manjula
Ambareesh
Leelavathi
K.Vijaya

Soundtrack

References

External links
 

1979 films
1970s Kannada-language films
Films scored by Satyam (composer)
Films directed by Y. R. Swamy